Roch La Salle  (August 6, 1928 – August 20, 2007) was a Canadian politician who served in the province of Quebec.  He represented the riding of Joliette in the House of Commons of Canada for 20 years. A popular figure, he was re-elected  six times during his tenure.

Born in St-Paul, La Salle had a career in public relations and sales when he first attempted to win a parliamentary seat as a Progressive Conservative in the 1965 federal election, running in Joliette—L'Assomption—Montcalm. He was defeated, but won on his next attempt in the renamed riding of Joliette in the 1968 election. He was one of only a handful of Quebec Tory members in that Parliament.

La Salle quit the party in 1971 to protest Tory leader Robert Stanfield's rejection of the concept that Canada was composed of "two nations" (deux nations) and that Quebec had the right to self-determination.  He was re-elected as an independent candidate in the 1972 election with the support of the separatist Parti Québécois.  He returned to the Tory caucus in early 1974.

Along with Heward Grafftey, he was one of only two Tory MPs elected from Quebec in the 1979 election that brought the Conservatives to power under Joe Clark. La Salle served as Minister of Supply and Services in the short-lived (1979–80) Clark government.

La Salle was the only Quebec Tory MP returned in the 1980 election, only surviving in his own riding by 389 votes. In early 1981, he resigned his seat in order to move to provincial politics and take the leadership of the Union Nationale (UN) political party prior to the 1981 Quebec provincial election. La Salle chose not run in his home town of Joliette because the riding was then represented by an old friend of his, Guy Chevrette, a member of the PQ and Party Whip. Instead, he ran in the neighbouring riding of Berthier.  The Union Nationale lost all five of its remaining seats as the PQ won a crushing victory. He then ran in a by-election that was called later that year to fill the vacancy his resignation had created, and won handily.

When the Tories again formed government after the 1984 election, this time under Brian Mulroney, La Salle became Minister of Public Works. He resigned from Cabinet in 1987 after being charged with accepting a bribe and influence peddling. He denied any wrongdoing, but did not run in the 1988 election. The criminal case against him was eventually dropped.

La Salle died on 20 August 2007 in a hospital in Saint-Charles-Borromée. He was 79 years of age.

Former Prime Minister Brian Mulroney said in a statement that he was saddened to hear of La Salle's death, calling him an example of a politician who was close to the people in his riding.

References

1928 births
2007 deaths
Leaders of the Union Nationale (Quebec)
Members of the 21st Canadian Ministry
Members of the 24th Canadian Ministry
Members of the House of Commons of Canada from Quebec
Members of the King's Privy Council for Canada
Progressive Conservative Party of Canada MPs